The George Main Stakes, is an Australian Turf Club Group 1 Thoroughbred horse race run under Weight for Age conditions, over a distance of 1600 metres at Randwick Racecourse, Sydney, Australia in September. Total prize money for the race is A$1,000,000.

History

The race is named after George Main, a former chairman of the Australian Jockey Club. Main lived with his wife Mary on Retreat, a grazing property at Illabo, west of Cootamundra on the southwest slopes of New South Wales. He bred racehorses and ran sheep.
The winner of the George Main is exempt from a ballot on the Epsom Handicap, and horses who run well often head for the Epsom.

Name
 2015–2019 Colgate Optic White Stakes

Grade
 1945–1978 - Principal Race
 1979 onwards - Group 1

Distance
 1945–1971 – 1 mile
 1972 onwards - 1600 metres

Records
 Winx (2017) – 1:33.65
 Legendary trainer T.J. Smith won this event eleven times.

Winners

 2022 - Anamoe
 2021 - Verry Elleegant
 2020 - Kolding
2019 - Avilius
 2018 - Winx
 2017 - Winx
 2016 - Winx
 2015 - Kermadec
 2014 - Sacred Falls
 2013 - Streama
 2012 - Shoot Out
 2011 - Sincero
 2010 - More Joyous
 2009 - Road To Rock
 2008 - Mentality
 2007 - †race not held
 2006 - Racing to Win
 2005 - Mr Celebrity
 2004 - Grand Armee
 2003 - Lonhro
 2002 - Defier
 2001 - Viscount
 2000 - Adam
 1999 - Shogun Lodge
 1998 - Dracula
 1997 - Encounter
 1996 - Juggler
 1995 - Turridu
 1994 - Durbridge
 1993 - March Hare
 1992 - Coronation Day
 1991 - Planet Ruler
 1990 - Shaftesbury Avenue
 1989 - Vo Rogue
 1988 - Gennaker
 1987 - Campaign King
 1986 - Ma Chiquita
 1985 - Roman Artist
 1984 - Inspired
 1983 - Emancipation
 1982 - Kingston Town
 1981 - Kingston Town
 1980 - Tullmax
 1979 - Imposing
 1978 - Party's Pride
 1977 - Blockbuster
 1976 - Purple Patch
 1975 - Hartshill
 1974 - Itchy Feet
 1973 - All Shot
 1972 - Nippon
 1971 - Baguette
 1970 - Ricochet
 1969 - Zephyrus
 1968 - Regal Rhythm
 1967 - Regal Rhythm
 1966 - Chantal
 1965 - Count Radiant
 1964 - Count Radiant
 1963 - Wenona Girl
 1962 - New Statesman
 1961 - Martello Towers
 1960 - Second Earl
 1959 - Amanullah
 1958 - Lindbergh
 1957 - Landy
 1956 - Kingster
 1955 - Prince Morvi
 1954 - Gendarme
 1953 - Tarien
 1952 - Montana
 1951 - Oversight
 1950 - San Domenico
 1949 - The Groom
 1948 - De La Salle
 1947 - Shannon
 1946 - Shannon
 1945 - Modulation

† Not held because of outbreak of equine influenza

See also
 List of Australian Group races
Group races

References

Open mile category horse races
Group 1 stakes races in Australia
Randwick Racecourse